Juncus patens is a species of rush, known by the common names spreading rush and California grey rush.

It is native to the West Coast of the United States from Washington to California, and into Baja California, Mexico.

It grows at seeps, springs, and riparian zones in stream beds and on river and pond banks, in marshes, and in other moist habitats.

Description
Juncus patens is a perennial herb forming narrow, erect bunches of stems. It spreads by rhizomes, which can increase a colonies width substantially.

The stems are thin, gray-green, often somewhat waxy, and grooved, and grow  in height.

The inflorescence sprouts from the side of the stem, rather than its tip. It holds many flowers, each of which has short, narrow, pointed tepals and six stamens. It flowers in the summer.

The fruit is a spherical red or brown capsule which fills and bulges from the dried flower remnants when mature. The seeds attract birds.

Cultivation
Juncus patens is cultivated as an ornamental plant, for use in traditional and wildlife gardens, and in natural landscaping design, and in habitat restoration projects. Its tall narrow form fits into narrow garden beds and planters adjacent to walkway walls, and in container planting. Despite its moist habitat origins, it can be very drought-tolerant when established.

In sustainable gardening and sustainable landscaping, Juncus patens is used in rain gardens and phytoremediation swales and intermittent ponds.

Cultivars
Cultivars of Juncus patens, selected for blue and/or gray foliage emphasis, include:
Juncus patens 'Carman's Grey' — Carmen's California Gray Rush,  steely blue-gray.
Juncus patens 'Elk Blue' — Elk Blue California Gray Rush, blue-gray.
Juncus patens 'Occidental Blue' — Occidental Blue California Gray Rush, gray-green.

References

External links

Jepson Manual Treatment of 'Juncus patens
Juncus patens — U.C. Photo gallery

patens
Flora of California
Flora of Baja California
Flora of Oregon
Flora of Washington (state)
Natural history of the California chaparral and woodlands
Flora of the Klamath Mountains
Flora of the Sierra Nevada (United States)
Natural history of the California Coast Ranges
Natural history of the Channel Islands of California
Natural history of the Peninsular Ranges
Natural history of the San Francisco Bay Area
Natural history of the Santa Monica Mountains
Natural history of the Transverse Ranges
Plants described in 1823
Garden plants of North America
Drought-tolerant plants
Flora without expected TNC conservation status